Ploubazlanec is a commune in the Côtes-d'Armor department in Brittany in northwestern France.

Historically its economy relied on fishing. Fishermen in the 19th century and early 20th century went to Iceland aboard sailing ships called goelettes.

The name Ploubazlanec is typically Breton, "plou" meaning "land of". The name changed from Pleraneg, which still can be seen on road signs.

Ploubazlanec is the embarkation point for boats to the Île-de-Bréhat.

The place was made famous by the French novel by Pierre Loti, Pêcheur d'Islande.

Population

Inhabitants of Ploubazlanec are called ploubazlanecains in French.

See also
Communes of the Côtes-d'Armor department

References

External links

Official website 

Communes of Côtes-d'Armor
Fishing in France